Gotthard is a Swiss hard rock band founded in Lugano by Steve Lee and Leo Leoni. Their last eleven albums have all reached number 1 in the Swiss album charts, making them one of the most successful Swiss acts ever. With two million albums sold, they managed to get multi-platinum awards in different parts of the world. The band takes its name from the Saint-Gotthard Massif.

Singer Steve Lee died in a motorcycle accident on 5 October 2010. In November 2011, Gotthard announced a new singer, Nic Maeder, through their official Facebook page and their website with a new song, "Remember It's Me", downloadable for free.

Influences 
Influences include Led Zeppelin, AC/DC, Whitesnake, Deep Purple, Bon Jovi, Van Halen and Aerosmith. Singer Steve Lee was especially fond of Whitesnake.

Gotthard also performed "Immigrant Song" (originally by Led Zeppelin) live and it featured exclusively on a CD by Classic Rock (a long running monthly UK rock magazine). "Hush" was also performed live and can be found on the Made In Switzerland and "D frosted" albums.

They have also covered songs from Bob Dylan, The Hollies, Manfred Mann and The Move.

In 2008, Gotthard was supporting act for one of their favourite bands Deep Purple, during Deep Purple's German Tour. They also played at the Magic Circle Music Festival alongside bands such as Manowar, Alice Cooper, Doro and W.A.S.P. in Bad Arolsen, Germany.

Gotthard also opened up for US rock band Bon Jovi in Switzerland, Germany and Italy, and for Canadian rock star Bryan Adams.

After forging a friendship during a Rock Meets Classic tour, Francis Rossi of Status Quo has collaborated with Gotthard by co-writing and featuring on multiple tracks: first, on the 2018 single "Bye Bye Caroline" from the album Defrosted 2 and then on the track "Missteria" from the 2020 album #13. "Bye Bye Caroline" was inspired by Status Quo's hit single Caroline from 1973.

Members 

Current members
Leo Leoni – guitar (1992–present)
Marc Lynn – bass (1992–present)
Freddy Scherer – guitar (2004–present)
Nic Maeder – vocals (2012–present)
Flavio Mezzodi – drums (2021–present)

Past members
Steve Lee – vocals (1992–2010; until his death)
Hena Habegger – drums (1992–2019)
Mandy Meyer – guitar (1996–2004)

Discography

Studio albums 
 Gotthard (1992)
 Dial Hard (1994)
 G. (1996)
 Open (1999)
 Homerun (2001)
 Human Zoo (2003)
 Lipservice (2005)
 Domino Effect (2007)
 Need to Believe (2009)
 Firebirth (2012)
 Bang! (2014)
 Silver (2017)
 #13 (2020)

Live albums 
 The Hamburg Tapes (1996)
 D Frosted (1997)
 Made in Switzerland – Live in Zürich (2006)
 Homegrown – Alive in Lugano (2011)
 Live & Bangin''' (official bootleg; 2015)
 Defrosted 2 (2018)

 Compilation albums 
 One Life One Soul – Best of Ballads (2002)
 One Team One Spirit – The Very Best (2004)
 Heaven: Best of Ballads – Part 2 (2010)
 Steve Lee – The Eyes of a Tiger: In Memory of Our Unforgotten Friend'' (2020)

References

External links 

Gotthard discography on jugi3.ch

Music in Lugano
Musical groups established in 1992
Nuclear Blast artists
Swiss glam metal musical groups
Swiss hard rock musical groups
Swiss heavy metal musical groups
English-language singers from Switzerland